Art Front was an art magazine co-founded by the Artists' Committee of Action and the Artists Union in New York. Twenty-five issues appeared between November 1934 and December 1937.

History

In early 1934 a group called the Artists' Committee of Action formed to protest Nelson Rockefeller's destruction of Diego Rivera's mural Man at the Crossroads; Hugo Gellert, Stuart Davis, Zoltan Hecht and Lionel S. Reiss were among the leaders. In the autumn of 1934 Herman Baron, director of the American Contemporary Art gallery, was asked to join them; he offered to publish a bulletin for the group, like those he had previously issued through his gallery. Gellert suggested to the Artists Union that they should collaborate on the project. The name Art Front was suggested by Herbert Kruckman.

The first issue appeared in November 1934. Baron was managing editor, with an editorial committee of sixteen, eight from each of the partner groups. Apart from Gellert, Davis and Hecht, those from the Artists' Committee of Action were Hilda Abel, Harold Baumbach, Abraham Harriton, Rosa Pringle and Jennings Tofel, while those from the Artists Union were Boris Gorelick, Katherine Gridley, Ethel Olenikov, Robert Jonas, Kruckman, Michael Loew, C. Mactarian and Max Spivak.

References

External links
 Marxists Internet Archive: Art Front history and scans of issues

Defunct magazines published in the United States
Magazines established in 1934
Magazines disestablished in 1937
Magazines published in New York City
Monthly magazines published in the United States
Visual arts magazines published in the United States